This is a list of the National Register of Historic Places listings in Hoonah–Angoon Census Area, Alaska.

This is intended to be a complete list of the properties and districts on the National Register of Historic Places in Hoonah-Angoon Census Area, Alaska, United States.  The locations of National Register properties and districts for which the latitude and longitude coordinates are included below, may be seen in a Google map.

There are 20 properties and districts listed on the National Register in the census area.

Current listings

|}

See also 

 List of National Historic Landmarks in Alaska
 National Register of Historic Places listings in Alaska

References 

Hoonah-Angoon Census Area